These are the most popular given names in the United States of America for all years of the 1880s.

1880 
Males
John
William
Charles
George
James
Joseph
Frank
Henry
Thomas
Harry
Females
Mary
Anna
Elizabeth
Margaret
Minnie
Emma
Martha
Alice
Marie
Annie; Sarah (tie)

1881 
Males
John
William
Charles
James
George 
Joseph
Frank
Henry
Edward; Harry; Thomas (tie)
-----
Females
Mary
Anna
Elizabeth
Margaret
Emma
Minnie
Sarah
Alice
Bertha
Grace

1882
Males
John
William
Charles
James
George
Frank
Joseph
Henry
Thomas
Harry
Females
Mary
Anna
Elizabeth
Emma; Margaret (tie)
Minnie
Bertha
Mabel
Florence; Ida (tie)
-----
-----

1883 

Males
John
William
Charles
George
James
Joseph
Frank
Harry; Henry (tie)
-----
-----
Females
Mary
Anna
Margaret
Emma
Elizabeth
Florence
Bertha
Alice
Sarah
Clara; Rose (tie)

1884 

Males
John
William;Eli(Tie)
George
Charles
James
Frank
Joseph
Harry
Henry
Thomas
Females
Mary
Anna
Elizabeth
Emma
Margaret
Minnie
Alice; Florence; Mia (tie)
Clara
Bertha; Rose (tie)
-----

1885 

Males
John
William 
Charles
Joseph
George; James (tie)
Frank
Robert
Henry
Edward
-----
Females
Mary
Anna
Elizabeth
Margaret
Emma
Ida
Rose
Minnie
Bertha
Annie

1886 

Males
John
William
George
James
Charles
Joseph
Frank
Henry
Thomas
Edward; Walter (tie)
Females
Mary
Anna
Elizabeth
Emma
Clara
Margaret
Minnie
Bertha
Rose
Ida; Sarah (tie)

1887 

Males
John
William
George
Charles
James
Frank; Joseph (tie)
Harry
Robert
Thomas
-----
Females
Mary
Anna
Emma
Margaret
Bertha
Elizabeth; Minnie (tie)
Florence
Mabel
Bessie; Helen; Jennie (tie)
-----

1888 

Males
John
William
George
Joseph
James
Charles
Frank
Harry
Robert
Thomas
Females
Mary
Anna
Margaret
Elizabeth
Bertha
Emma
Ethel
Rose
Bessie
Ida; Minnie (tie)

1889 

Males
John
William
George
James
Charles
Joseph
Frank
Harry
Edward
Robert
Females
Mary
Anna
Elizabeth
Margaret
Minnie
Helen; Rose (tie)
Bertha
Alice; Emma (tie)
-----
-----

References
http://www.ssa.gov/OACT/babynames/index.html
http://www.ssa.gov/OACT/babynames/decades/names1880s.html

1880s
1880s in the United States